Lindsay Ross Meggs (born September 2, 1962) is an American retired baseball coach. He played college baseball for the UCLA Bruins from 1981 to 1984. He then served as the head coach of the Oxnard (1990), Long Beach City (1991–1993), Chico State Wildcats (1994–2006), Indiana State (2007–2009) and the Washington Huskies (2010—2022).

Early years
Born in San Jose, California, Meggs graduated from Saratoga High School in Saratoga and played college baseball at UCLA, starting at third base all four years.  He was honorable mention All-Conference in 1983, and drafted after both his junior and senior years.  Selected in the 15th round of the  1984 MLB Draft, Meggs signed with the Kansas City Royals and enjoyed a brief professional career before returning to UCLA to complete his degree.

Coaching career
After his playing career ended, Meggs began coaching at De Anza College in Cupertino, serving as an assistant for a season in 1988 before moving south to California Lutheran University in Thousand Oaks for another season.  Meggs earned his first head coaching opportunity at Oxnard College where he worked for one year in 1990, then moved to Long Beach City College for three seasons.  At LBCC, his teams went 75–51–1 and made the playoffs each year.

Chico State
Meggs moved north to Cal State Chico in 1994, where he was head coach for 13 years.  The Wildcats were a Division II national power under him, winning two national championships, appearing seven times in the Division II College World Series, and claiming eight conference titles.  Meggs was Division II National Coach of the Year twice, and regional and conference coach of the year seven times each. The Wildcats' home venue, Ray Bohler Field, was renovated in 1997 and became the 4,200-seat Nettleton Stadium.

Indiana State
Meggs' success at Chico State landed him a Division I job at Indiana State in Terre Haute, where he worked for three years.  The Sycamores were 33–21 overall and finished second in the Missouri Valley Conference after being picked to finish sixth in the preseason.  Four players were named first team All-Conference that season, with five others earning other conference awards.  Meggs was named MVC Coach of the Year for his efforts.

Washington
In 2009, Meggs was introduced as the new head coach at Washington on July 27. In his first season in 2010, the Huskies were 28–28, an improvement of five wins over the previous season.  Among his efforts at Washington has been seeking additional personal general enhancements, particularly to Husky Ballpark and the Huskies' indoor facilities.  After the 2012 season, three additional years were added to his contract, through 2018.

Following Washington's runner-up finish in the conference in 2014, Meggs was named Pac-12 coach of the year. Picked in the preseason to finish low in the standings, the Huskies posted a 21-9  record in conference and made their first post-season appearance in a decade.  Although ranked in the national top ten for much of the season, Washington was overlooked as a regional host. In the NCAA regional at the University of Mississippi in Oxford, Washington was the runner-up, losing two close games to the host Rebels. Both games with Ole Miss were decided by one run and both had over 9,300 in attendance at Swayze Field.
 (The Rebels won their Super Regional on the road and advanced to semifinals of the College World Series). That summer, Meggs was granted a six-year contract extension at Washington, worth $2.2 million.

On June 6, 2022, the University of Washington announced Meggs' retirement as baseball coach after 13 seasons.

Head coaching record
Sources:

References

External links
 Washington profile

1962 births
Living people
Cal Lutheran Kingsmen baseball coaches
Chico State Wildcats baseball coaches
De Anza Dons baseball coaches
Indiana State Sycamores baseball coaches
UCLA Bruins baseball players
Washington Huskies baseball coaches
Baseball players from San Jose, California